In the Night Time is the third album by American bass guitarist Michael Henderson, released in 1978 by Buddah Records.

Track listing
All tracks composed by Michael Henderson; except where indicated
"Take Me I'm Yours" 4:20
"We Can Go On" 6:17 
"Happy"  6:04
"In the Night-Time" (Michael Henderson, Sylvester Rivers)  4:55
"Whisper In My Ear" (Jerry Jones)  7:11
"Am I Special" (Michael Henderson, Rudy Robinson)  4:11
"Yours Truly, Indiscreetly" (Lamont Johnson, Randall Jacobs)  3:45
"One To One" (Herman Curry, Jr.)  4:58

Personnel
Michael Henderson – lead and backing vocals, bass, handclaps, guitar, keyboards
Ray Parker Jr., Randall Jacobs – guitar
Herman Curry Jr. – bass, handclaps
Jerry Jones, Keith Benson – drums
Mark Johnson, Rod Lumpkin – organ, clavinet
Rudy Robinson, Gary Crista – keyboards, synthesizer
Keith Benson, Lorenzo "Bag of Tricks" Brown – percussion
Eli Fontaine – saxophone
Evan Solot – trumpet
Cheryl Norton, Rena Scott – vocals
Barbara Ingram, Evette Benton, Carla L. Benson – backing vocals

Charts

Singles

References

External links
 Michael Henderson-In The Night Time at Discogs

1978 albums
Michael Henderson albums
Buddah Records albums
Albums recorded at Sigma Sound Studios